Keal Carlile (born 20 March 1990) is an English former professional rugby league footballer.

Career
Keal made his début for the Bradford Bulls against St. Helens on 13 June 2008, but made only one further appearance for the Bradford Bulls before he signed for the Huddersfield Giants in October 2008.

In 2010, Carlile joined the Barrow Raiders on loan.

In the opening game of the 2011 season, Carlile scored his first Super League try in a 28–18 victory over Warrington Wolves. In the following game, against the Castleford Tigers, Carlile was forced to leave the field due to extreme fatigue. He later underwent surgery after being diagnosed with a heart valve problem. He was released by Huddersfield at the end of the season, and signed for Hull Kingston Rovers on a two-year deal.

He spent a further one and a half years at Hull Kingston Rovers, making a total 35 appearances for the club and 3 on dual registration with the Gateshead Thunder. He scored 2 tries in 2014 before being granted a release to seek further first team opportunities in 2015.

In March 2015, Carlile joined Sheffield Eagles on an 18-month contract going on to make 25 appearances that season.

He retired in February 2020.

References

External links
Featherstone Rovers profile
Sheffield Eagles profile

1990 births
Living people
Barrow Raiders players
Bradford Bulls players
English rugby league players
Featherstone Rovers players
Halifax R.L.F.C. players
Huddersfield Giants players
Hull Kingston Rovers players
Newcastle Thunder players
Rugby league hookers
Rugby league players from Pontefract
Sheffield Eagles players